Johaneko Louis-Jean (born 28 June 2004) is a French professional footballer who plays as a defender for  club Bordeaux.

Club career 
On 2 January 2022, Louis-Jean made his professional debut for Bordeaux in a 3–0 Coupe de France loss to Brest.

International career 
Louis-Jean has represented France at under-18 level.

References 

2004 births
Living people
Sportspeople from Bayonne
French footballers
France youth international footballers
Association football defenders
Aviron Bayonnais FC players
FC Girondins de Bordeaux players
Ligue 1 players

Championnat National 3 players
Footballers from Nouvelle-Aquitaine
French people of Haitian descent